BBC Chartering GmbH, owned by the Briese Schiffahrt Group, is an international shipping company based in Leer, Germany. With over 150 vessels in their fleet, BBC Chartering is the largest multipurpose, heavy lift and project shipping company in the world. BBC Chartering concentrates on specialized marine transport.

History 

BBC Chartering opened its first office in Bremen, Germany in 1997. Two years later, the headquarters was moved to Leer, Germany. Offices in Argentina and Houston, Texas followed. Through joint ventures, BBC continued to expand its presence and services to Latin America, Asia and the Mediterranean. The Singapore office was established in 2004 through a joint venture with Clipper Projects called Asia Project Chartering (APC). Today the company operates 30 global offices with main hubs in Leer, Houston, and Singapore.

Operations 

BBC chartering has been involved in many areas of shipping, including:
Resupply missions for US Antarctic bases.
Transportation of the radio telescope antennas used for in the Atacama Large Millimeter Array.
Transport of turbines during construction of the Greater Gabbard Wind Farm.
Mining freight.
Bulk transport, including grain, and fertilizer.

In addition to traditional chartering services, BBC Chartering also operates throughout 16 regular trade lanes.
BBC Chartering's current fleet includes 150 vessels with an average age of 5 years.

References

External links

Shipping companies of Germany